Trypherogenes is a genus of moth in the family Gelechiidae. It contains the species Trypherogenes chrysodesma, which is found in Indonesia (Sulawesi).

References

Gelechiinae